Volčkova Vas ( or ;) is a small settlement in the foothills of the Žumberak/Gorjanci range, southeast of Šentjernej in southeastern Slovenia. The entire Municipality of Šentjernej is part of the traditional region of Lower Carniola and is now included in the Southeast Slovenia Statistical Region.

References

External links
Volčkova Vas on Geopedia

Populated places in the Municipality of Šentjernej